The 2001 Monterey Sports Car Championships presented by Mazda was the ninth round of the 2001 American Le Mans Series season.  It took place at Mazda Raceway Laguna Seca, California, on September 9, 2001.

Official results
Class winners in bold.

Statistics
 Pole Position - #1 Audi Sport North America - 1:15.238
 Fastest Lap - #1 Audi Sport North America - 1:17.011
 Distance - 432.205 km
 Average Speed - 156.843 km/h

External links
  
 World Sports Racing Prototypes - Race Results

M
Monterey Sports Car Championships
Monterey Sports Car